India's Most Attractive Brands - 2013 is an annual study based on a primary research conducted across 16 Indian cities  based on TRA's (Trust Research Advisory) proprietary 36-attribute Attractiveness Matrix. The research report is available in hardcase. The research studies the magnetic property of attractiveness that a brand displays and its influences and preferences on brand influencers. The report also lists the 1200 of India's Most Attractive Brands.

In its inaugural year, Samsung Mobiles was listed as India's Most Attractive Brand, followed by Sony as the second Most Attractive. Nokia ranked third and was followed in fourth position by South Korean electronics major, LG. Tata, the Indian conglomerate was ranked as India's fifty Most Attractive Brand in 2013.

India's Top 20 Attractive Brands come from 8 categories with Personal Accessories represented by 5 brands, 3 each for Diversified and FMCG, 2 from Durables, F&B, Personal Gadgets and Technology and 1 brand from among Automobiles.

The category-wise Most Attractive brands include: Apparel - Raymond, Automobile- Maruti Suzuki, Tyres-MRF, BFSI - LIC, F&B - Amul, Healthcare - Dabur, Hospitality - Trident, Internet - Google, Media (Print) - Anandabazar Patrika, Media (TV) - NDTV, Retail - KFC and Technology - Dell.

References 

Indian brands